A god complex is an unshakable belief characterized by consistently inflated feelings of personal ability, privilege, or infallibility. A person with a god complex may refuse to admit the possibility of their error or failure, even in the face of irrefutable evidence, intractable problems or difficult or impossible tasks. The person is also highly dogmatic in their views, meaning the person speaks of their personal opinions as though they were unquestionably correct. Someone with a god complex may exhibit no regard for the conventions and demands of society, and may request special consideration or privileges.

God complex is not a clinical term nor diagnosable disorder and does not appear in the Diagnostic and Statistical Manual of Mental Disorders (DSM).  The recognized diagnostic name for the behaviors associated with a god complex is narcissistic personality disorder (NPD).  A god complex may also be associated with mania or a superiority complex.

The first person to use the term "god complex" was Ernest Jones (1913–51). His description, at least in the contents page of Essays in Applied Psycho-Analysis, describes the god complex as belief that one is a god.

Jehovah complex
Jehovah complex is a related term used in Jungian analysis to describe a neurosis of egotistical self-inflation. Use included in psychoanalytic contributions to psychohistory and biography, with, for example, Fritz Wittels using the term about Sigmund Freud in his 1924 biography and H. E. Barnes using the term about George Washington and Andrew Jackson.

See also

 Abnormal psychology
 Cult of personality
 Egotheism
 Fanaticism
 Grandiose delusions
 Hubris
 Mental health of Jesus
 Messiah complex
 Narcissism
 Narcissistic personality disorder
 Omnipotence
 Personal fable
 Playing God (ethics)
 Superiority complex

References

External links

 McLemee.com - The Shrink with a God Complex Ronald Hayman Newsday, (April 22, 2001)

Analytical psychology
Complex (psychology)
Popular psychology